The 1959–60 Divizia A was the forty-second season of Divizia A, the top-level football league of Romania.

Teams

League table

Results

Top goalscorers

Champion squad

See also 

 1959–60 Divizia B

References

Liga I seasons
Romania
1959–60 in Romanian football